Eytan Rockaway is a film director, writer and producer. 
After graduating from NYU's Tisch School of the Arts, he co-founded A Matter of Substance, an entertainment company.

Rockaway directed and produced The Abandoned, which was an official selection of the Los Angeles Film Festival and the Chicago International Film Festival. IFC Films released The Abandoned in theaters January 2016. His second feature Lansky starring Harvey Keitel was released June 2021.

Awards and recognition
2015 Chicago International Film Festival - Nominated, " The Abandoned" (aka The Confines)
2015 Los Angeles Film Festival - Nominated, "The Abandoned" (aka The Confines)
2015 Screamfest - Nominated, "The Abandoned" (aka The Confines)
2012 La Jolla Fashion Film Festival - Award Nominee, " Dreams of the Heartbroken"
2011 Milano Film Festival - Award Nominee, "My First Time"

References

External links

Living people
American film directors
Tisch School of the Arts alumni
Year of birth missing (living people)